Paul Tulane (May 10, 1801 – March 27, 1887) was an American philanthropist and donor. Born in Sherry Valley, near Princeton, New Jersey, to a prominent French merchant family, Tulane made his fortune from a retail and dry goods company. Later, he became one of New Orleans' most prominent pro-confederate philanthropists and the namesake of Tulane University, formerly known as the Medical College of Louisiana.

Ancestry

Paul Tulane's paternal great-grandfather was Pierre Urbain Tulasne (born 1709, Hommes, Indre et Loire – died 1749, Rillé), a merchant and master butcher in Rillé, France.

Pierre Urbain Tulasne had two sons: Gatien Tulasne-Jaminière (1739, Rillé – 1783, Rillé), a seneschal of the lands and seigniories of Gizeux, royal notary in Baugé, and bailiff of the barony of Rillé; and Gatien Pierre Urbain Tulasne-Jaminière (1764, Rillé – 1823, Rillé), a royal notary in Baugé. The notary office in Rillé still exists at "1 rue de l'Eglise". Gatien Tulasne-Jaminière had two sons: Pierre Louis Mathurin Tulasne and Pierre Tulasne.

Louis Tulane (July 16, 1767, Rillé – July 21, 1847, Sherry Valley, Princeton) was a commercial trader in French luxury manufactured goods between Nantes (France) and his establishment in St. Marc (Saint-Domingue). Studies on his life do not indicate he owned slaves in Saint-Domingue. Louis Tulane is not on the list of landowners in Saint-Domingue compensated by the French government between 1828 and 1834 (6 volumes), in execution of the law of April 30, 1826.

After the Haitian Revolution (1791), Louis Tulane went into exile in 1792 to Sherry Valley—near Princeton, New Jersey—and took American nationality in 1793. In 1799, he bought a 500-acre farm from Peter Anthony Malou (1753 – 1827), a patriot and priest who was exiled from Belgium. This farm remained in the family until 1847, and was sold circa 1870. The house built by Louis Tulane was destroyed.

During his life, Louis Tulane returned several times to France. On June 5, 1835, while traveling from Le Havre to New York on the ship Albany, he was designated as: age 65, merchant, United States.

Pierre Tulasne (1742, Rillé – 1811, Cuon, near Baugé) was a refractory priest of the Baugé parish, and was deported to Spain by French revolutionaries. Upon his later arrival to Princeton, he registered the birth of his eldest son Louis Stephen Tulane (August 4, 1795, Princeton – October 2, 1871, Wetumpka, Alabama) in the parish of (Old) St Joseph's Church in Philadelphia, the only authorized Catholic parish in the 13 American Colonies (which were predominantly Anglican). General de Rochambeau and the Marquis de La Fayette came to pray there in 1782, during American independence. Since the distance between Philadelphia and Sherry Valley was likely too great to attend services, Louis Tulane would have adopted Presbyterianism.

Following the death of their father Gatien in 1783, the two brothers divided their inheritance before a notary in Château-du-Loir (Indre et Loire, France) on February 25, 1815. Their uncle, Gatien Pierre Urbain, bought his brother Louis his share of land and farms in Rillé (named "La Valinière farm", still in the family) for 5,925 Francs at the time.

Early life 
Paul Tulane was the son of Louis Tulasne (deformed to "Tulane"). Paul was baptized in Rillé by his uncle, Pierre Tulasne, and was a devout Catholic during his life.

Paul Tulane was educated in private schools, including Somerville Academy in New Jersey, until the age of fifteen. He then worked briefly in a store in Princeton. From 1818, he spent three years traveling the southern United States with his older brother Louis Stephen Tulane and his first cousin Paul Tulasne-Jaminière (1795, Rillé – 1830, Tours), a lawyer and son of notary Gatien Pierre Urbain Tulasne-Jaminière.

In 1840, Tulane and his father visited Rillé and the commercial ports of France. On observing the decadence of the foreign trade ports of Nantes and Bordeaux (his father had left Bordeaux in 1790) due to slave revolts in the West Indies, he was convinced that a similar fate would befall New Orleans in the event of emancipation in the United States.

It was from his two tours that Tulane developed a keen interest in the economic, cultural, social, and educational development of New Orleans, and ended up devoting his fortune to it, which was already $250,000 in 1840.

Career and philanthropy 
In 1822, Tulane established Paul Tulane and Co. in New Orleans, a retail and wholesale dry goods and clothing business. Later, he invested in real estate in both New Orleans and New Jersey. By 1828, he had amassed a fortune of over $150,000. His business operated for nearly 40 years, and retired with a large fortune in 1857.

Around this time, Tulane bought the John P. Stockton home in Princeton, now known as the Walter Lowrie House, where he subsequently resided. During the American Civil War, Tulane was the largest donor in New Orleans to the Confederate States of America, but the historian John D. Winters in Civil War in Louisiana (1963) does not provide the amount Tulane contributed. He donated $300 (1874 value) to erect a Confederate monument in Greenwood Cemetery. Tulane has been described as one of the most generous contributors to the Ladies' Benevolent Association of Louisiana, an institution dedicated to producing Confederate monuments.

For many years, Tulane gave liberally to the charitable institutions and Presbyterian churches of Princeton and New Orleans. 

In 1882, he donated $363,000 (1882 value) to improve higher education in the city of New Orleans. Tulane's Act of Donation ultimately resulted in the renaming of the University of Louisiana (founded as the Medical College of Louisiana) to the Tulane University of Louisiana, in his honor and turning the once public institution into a private one, the only such instance in United States history.

Death
Tulane died near Princeton and is buried in the Princeton Cemetery on Witherspoon Street. In his honor, he has several streets named after him throughout the country, including Tulane Street in Princeton, and Tulane Avenue in New Orleans.

Notes

References

Sources
 
 
 
 John Smith Kendall, "Paul Tulane," Louisiana Historical Quarterly, XX (1937).
 
 

 Collier's New Encyclopedia (1921).
 transcription of transfer documents - departmental archives of Indre et Loire, France.

1801 births
1887 deaths
American people of French descent
American Presbyterians
Businesspeople from New Orleans
People from Princeton, New Jersey
Tulane University
Burials in New Jersey
Burials at Princeton Cemetery
19th-century American philanthropists
19th-century American businesspeople